La Barca is a town and municipality in the Mexican state of Jalisco, and is about an hour and 20 minutes from the state capital Guadalajara.

References
La Barca at GeoNet names server

Municipalities of Jalisco